David Francis Pickering (born 16 December 1960) is Chairman of Hydro Industries, who harness technology To clean up industrial waste, safeguard the environment and provide safe drinking water to some of the most disadvantaged people in the world.  http://www.hydro-industries.co.uk/meet-the-team.htm?teamid=31&id=1
He is also a former Wales international rugby union player. He played club rugby for Llanelli RFC and Neath RFC. He won 23 caps for Wales between 1983 and 1987 and captained the national team on eight occasions.

Pickering went on to coach Neath RFC for five years before becoming Team Manager of the Wales A team and subsequently the Wales national team. He later became Chairman of the Welsh Rugby Union (WRU), the board of the Millennium Stadium and a member of the International Rugby Board Council.  He spent 5 years as Director of the Rugby World Cup.  A recent profile noted that he nearly died playing against Fiji https://www.walesonline.co.uk/sport/rugby/rugby-news/man-who-could-died-playing-18384616

Notes

1960 births
Living people
Llanelli RFC players
Neath RFC players
People educated at Dwr-y-Felin Comprehensive School
Rugby union flankers
Rugby union players from Briton Ferry
Wales international rugby union players
Wales rugby union captains
Wales Rugby Union officials
Welsh rugby union players